Ramón González (1895 – death date unknown) was a Cuban third baseman in the Negro leagues and Cuban League in the 1910s and 1920s.

A native of Havana, Cuba, González played in the Negro leagues for the Jersey City Cubans in 1916 and the Cuban Stars (East) in 1919. He also played several seasons in the Cuban League between 1915 and 1924.

References

External links
Baseball statistics and player information from Baseball-Reference Black Baseball Stats and Seamheads

1895 births
Date of birth missing
Year of death missing
Place of death missing
Almendares (baseball) players
Cuban Stars (East) players
Habana players
Leopardos de Santa Clara players
Long Branch Cubans players
Baseball third basemen
Baseball players from Havana